Takebayashi (written:  or ) is a Japanese surname. Notable people with the surname include:

, Japanese photographer
, Japanese swimmer
, Japanese samurai

Fictional characters
, a character in the manga series Assassination Classroom
Ryoma Takebayashi, the main character of the light novel series By the Grace of the Gods

Japanese-language surnames